Lyonetiidae is a family of moths with some 200 described species. These are small, slender moths, the wingspan rarely exceeding 1 cm. The very narrow forewings, held folded backwards covering the hindwings and abdomen, often have pointed apices noticeably up- or down-turned. The larvae are leaf miners.

The families Bucculatricidae and Bedelliidae are sometimes considered subfamilies of Lyonetiidae.

Genera

Acanthocnemes
Arctocoma
Atalopsycha
Busckia
Cateristis
Chrysolytis
Cladarodes
Compsoschema
Copobathra
Crobylophora
Cycloponympha

Daulocoma
Diplothectis
Erioptris
Eulyonetia
Exegetia
Hierocrobyla
Leioprora
Leucoedemia
Leucoptera
Lyonetia
Micropostega

Microthauma
Orochion
Otoptris
Petasobathra
Phyllobrostis
Platacmaea
†Prolyonetia
Prytaneutis
Stegommata
Taeniodictys

References
Natural History Museum genus database
Family description